List of animated films made in Estonia.

Republic of Estonia 1918-1940

Estonian SSR 1940-1991
List of Estonian animated films made in the Estonian SSR 1940-1991

1950s

1960s

1970s

1980s

Republic of Estonia since 1991
List of Estonian animated films made in Republic of Estonia since 1991.

1990s

2000s

2010s

2020s

References

Lists of animated films
Animated
History of animation